In mathematics, especially real analysis, a flat function is a smooth function  all of whose derivatives vanish at a given point . The flat functions are, in some sense, the antitheses of the analytic functions. An analytic function  is given by a convergent power series close to some point :

In the language of Taylor's theorem, the non-constant part of the function always lies in the remainder  for all .

The function need not be flat at just one point. But there are also other, less trivial, examples.

Example

The function defined by

 

Thus, this is an example of a non-analytic smooth function. The pathological nature of this example is partially illuminated by the fact that its extension to the complex numbers is, in fact, not differentiable.

References

 

Real analysis
Algebraic geometry
Differential calculus
Smooth functions
Differential structures